{{DISPLAYTITLE:C5H12O3}}
The molecular formula C5H12O3 (molar mass: 120.15 g/mol, exact mass: 120.0786 u) may refer to:

 2-(2-Methoxyethoxy)ethanol
 Trimethylolethane (TME)